State Route 201 (SR 201) is a primary state highway in the U.S. state of Virginia. The state highway runs  from SR 354 near Mollusk north to U.S. Route 360 (US 360) in Heathsville. SR 201 connects western Lancaster County and, indirectly, the county seat of Lancaster with the Northumberland County seat of Heathsville.

Route description

SR 201 begins at an intersection with SR 354 (River Road) near the hamlet of Mollusk. The state highway heads northeast as White Chapel Road and crosses Little Branch, a tributary of the Western Branch of the Corrotoman River. SR 201 intersects SR 3 (Historyland Highway) in the hamlet of Lively and crosses the Belwood Swamp on its way to McNeals Corner. There, the state highway turns north onto Court House Road. SR 201 has a right-angle turn south of Miskimon; from there to Miskimon, the state highway runs on top of the Lancaster–Northumberland county line. The county line is also the height of land between the Corrotoman River drainage, which empties into the Rappahannock River, and the watershed of the Great Wicomico River, which flows directly into the Chesapeake Bay. SR 201 fully enters Northumberland County at Miskimon and has another sharp turn at Howland. The state highway crosses the two streams that form the Great Wicomico River—Bush Mill Stream and Crabbs Mill Stream—before reaching its northern terminus at US 360 (Northumberland Highway) in Heathsville.

Major intersections

References

External links

Virginia Highways Project: VA 201

201
State Route 201
State Route 201